Epiparthia is a monotypic snout moth genus described by Hans Georg Amsel in 1935. Its only species, Epiparthia vasta, described by the same author, is found in Jordan.

References

Phycitinae
Monotypic moth genera
Moths of the Middle East
Taxa named by Hans Georg Amsel
Pyralidae genera